Margarita Iosifovna Aliger (– August 1, 1992) was a Soviet and Russian poet, translator, and journalist.

Biography
She was born in Odessa in a family of Jewish office workers; the real family name was Zeliger. As a teenager she worked at a chemical plant. From 1934 to 1937 she studied at the Maxim Gorky Literature Institute.

The main themes of her early poetry were the heroism of the Soviet people during industrialization (Year of birth, 1938; Railroad, 1939; Stones and grass, 1940) and during World War II (Lyrics, 1943). Her most famous poem is "Zoya" (1942), about Zoya Kosmodemyanskaya, a young girl killed by Nazis. This work was one of the most popular poems during the Soviet era. From 1940 to 1950, the poetry of Aliger was characterised by a mix of optimistic semi-official verses ("Leninskie mountains", 1953), and poems in which Aliger tried to analyse the situation in her country in a realistic way ("Your Victory", 1944 - 1945). In 1956, in a gathering of Khrushchev with the intelligentsia he admonished the writers for interfering with the political system. It is noted that Aliger was the only writer to speak up against him at the event. It was after his retirement that he apologized to her for his behavior. Aliger wrote numerous essays and articles about Russian literature and her impressions on travelling ("On poetry and poets", 1980; "The return from Chile", 1966).

Her first husband was the composer Konstantin Makarov-Rakitin, who was killed at the front near Yartsevo in 1941 after the death of their infant son (their daughter Tatyana [1940-1974] became a poet and translator), a double tragedy that left her devastated. The following year she had an affair with the author Alexander Fadeyev; from this union was born a daughter Maria (Masha Enzenberger), who married Hans Magnus Enzensberger and lived abroad for twenty years, killing herself shortly after a brief return to Russia in 1991. Aliger's second and final husband was the Central Committee official Igor Chernoutsan (1918-1990). She survived all her husbands and children, dying shortly after her daughter Maria Enzensberger. Margarita Aliger is buried in Peredelkino next to her daughters.

Selected works
God rozhdeniia (Year of Birth) (1938)
Zoya (1942)
Your victory (1945)
Great Expectations
Two (1956)
Leninskie gory (Lenin Hills)
Sinii chas (Blue Hour) (1970)

References

External links
Poetry of Margarita Aliger

1915 births
1992 deaths
20th-century Russian journalists
20th-century Russian translators
20th-century Russian women writers
Writers from Odesa
Communist Party of the Soviet Union members
Stalin Prize winners
Recipients of the Order of Friendship of Peoples
Recipients of the Order of the Red Banner of Labour
Jewish poets
Odesa Jews
Russian translators
Russian women journalists
Russian women poets
Soviet journalists
Soviet translators
Soviet women poets
Maxim Gorky Literature Institute alumni